Olivia Nash MBE is an actress and performer from Northern Ireland. Nash has appeared on the Northern Ireland scene for over 40 years. Olivia performs on stage, television and radio where she has performed with James Young for 11 years and Northern Ireland comedian Nuala McKeever. She has toured the United States and Canada with the Charabanc Theatre Company, and is best known for her role as ‘Ma’ in the television series Give My Head Peace.

Personal life 
Nash grew up in Larne, with her mother and father, Patsy and Tommy, and her sister Mel. When she left school, she got involved with the Larne Drama Circle and, as of 2019, is still a member.

She and her husband, who died when Nash was 38, had one daughter together, Patricia. She has 3 grandchildren, Gabriel, Daisy and Livi.

Career and Charity Work
Olivia Nash was awarded an MBE for services to theatre and charity in 2006.

Olivia Nash has raised £189,000 for The Children’s Hospice with the help of her ‘Mrs Walker’ character.  She is also the face of the EHS Wake Up to Waste campaign.

Filmography

References

External links
 

Year of birth missing (living people)
Living people
Members of the Order of the British Empire
Stage actresses from Northern Ireland
Television actresses from Northern Ireland
Place of birth missing (living people)